The discography of Amorphis, a Finnish heavy metal band, consists of fourteen studio albums, fifteen singles, three extended plays, and five compilation albums.

Amorphis was founded by Jan Rechberger, Tomi Koivusaari, and Esa Holopainen in 1990.

Albums

Studio albums

Compilation albums

Extended plays

Singles

Demos

Video albums

Music videos

References

External links

Discographies of Finnish artists
Heavy metal group discographies